Nordstromia coffeata is a moth in the family Drepanidae. It was described by Inoue in 1992. It is found in the Philippines (Luzon, Mindanao), Borneo and Peninsular Malaysia.

References

Moths described in 1992
Drepaninae